The 2013 Malaysia FA Cup, also known as the Astro Piala FA due to the competition's sponsorship by Astro Arena, was the 24th season of the Malaysia FA Cup, a knockout competition for Malaysia's state football association and clubs.

Kelantan defended the title after defeating Johor Darul Ta'zim 1–0 in the final.

The cup winner of the 2013 edition has qualified for the 2014 AFC Cup.

Teams

Format

30 teams will participate in this tournament instead of 32 in the 2012 edition. 2012 winners Kelantan and runners-up Sime Darby have received byes for this edition and will progress straight into the Round of 16.

Just like the previous edition, the first two rounds would be single matches. The quarter finals and semi finals would be played over two legs while the final will be played at National Stadium, Bukit Jalil, Kuala Lumpur, on 26 June.

Matches
The draw for the Piala FA 2013 was held at Wisma FAM on 10 December 2012.

Cambodian club Preah Khan Reach is invited for the 2nd time. to participate in the Piala FA, after exiting in the Round of 16 in the 2012 edition.

The Singapore club LionsXII is also participating for the second time in this competition, after being knocked out in the first round by PKNS to a 1-0 aggregate loss.

Bracket

Round of 32
The first round will commence on 25 January 2013.

Round of 16
The second round will commence on 26 February 2013.

Quarter-finals
The first leg matches will be played on 6 April 2013, with the second legs to be held on 16 April 2013.

|}

First leg

Second leg

Semi-finals
The first leg matches will be played on 25 May 2013, with the second legs to be held on 28 May 2013.

 (a)
|}

First leg

Second leg

Final

Winners

Season statistics

Top scorers

See also
 2013 Malaysia Super League
 2013 Malaysia Premier League
 2013 Malaysia FAM League
 Piala FA

References

 
2013 domestic association football cups
FA